Malikova is a Russian feminine surname. The masculine counterpart surname is Malikov. People with this name include:
 Afag Malikova (born 1947), Azerbaijani dancer
 Anna Malikova (born 1965), Uzbek pianist
 Anna Malíková (born 1959) Slovak former politician (MP 1998 to 2006, and 2010 to 2012)
 Barbora Malíková (born 2001), Czech sprinter
 Helena Malikova (born 1983), Slovakian civil servant 
 Najiba Malikova (1921–1992) Azerbaijani actress
 Nigar Malikova (born 1983), Azerbaijani footballer
 Zuzana Malíková (born 1983), Slovakian race walker

Russian-language surnames
Slavic-language female forms of surnames
Czech-language surnames
Slovak-language surnames
Azerbaijani-language surnames